was a town located in Kumage District, Yamaguchi Prefecture, Japan.

On April 21, 2003, Kumage, along with the cities of Tokuyama and Shinnan'yō, and the town of Kano (from Tsuno District), was merged to create the city of Shūnan.

External links
Shūnan official website 

Dissolved municipalities of Yamaguchi Prefecture
Shūnan, Yamaguchi